Carmen Mauri (song of a Maur) is an anonymous Polish medieval poem written in Latin. It tells the story of Polish magnate Piotr Włast and his rebellion against Prince Władysław Wygnaniec. The poem has survived only in fragmentary form. Its author and exact date of creation is unknown, it is presumed that the author was a Benedictine monk and the poem was written between the second half of the 12th century and the beginning of the 14th century.

Bibliography
 
 
 "Cronica Petri Comitis Poloniae" together with the "Carmen Mauri", ed. M. Plezia, Kraków 1951. IHL Series 2 volume 3.
Mały słownik pisarzy polskich, 1969 

History of Poland during the Piast dynasty
Medieval Latin texts
Polish poems
Latin poems